The Ghazi Shah Mound is most ancient archaeological site located in Johi Tehsil Dadu District Sindh, Pakistan. It was explored by N. G. Majumdar and Louis Flam has also studied and surveyed this ancient site. It is very earliest site of Indus Valley civilization dates back to 4000 to 6000 years.

This place is named after Syed Gaji Shah whose shrine is near this place.

References
This information is given by Anshika Amol Gole
History of Sindh
Indus Valley civilisation sites
Archaeological sites in Pakistan
Ancient history of Pakistan
Ruins in Pakistan
Tourist attractions in Sindh
Archaeological sites in Sindh